Kalanchoe adelae is a succulent plant that grows in the Comoros. It was discovered by French botanist Raymond Hamet. It is named after Madame Adele Le Chartier, an acquaintance of Hamet.

References 

Flora of the Comoros
Adelae